A by-election for the seat of Polwarth in the Victorian Legislative Assembly was held on 31 October 2015. The by-election was triggered by the resignation of Terry Mulder on 3 September 2015. Former Premier of Victoria, Denis Napthine, resigned his seat representing the adjacent district of South-West Coast on the same day as Mulder. The by-election for South-West Coast was held on the same day.

Candidates

The Labor government did not contest the by-elections in the safe Liberal seats of Polwarth and South-West Coast.

How-to-vote cards
Candidate volunteers attempt to distribute how-to-vote cards to voters at polling booths which show the candidate's suggested preference allocation. Candidates and parties which suggested preferences are shown in each column of the table below. The Australian Sex Party ran an open card at this by-election.

Result

|- style="background-color:#E9E9E9"
! colspan="6" style="text-align:left;" |After distribution of preferences

The VEC distributed preliminary preferences until a candidate exceeded 50 per cent of the vote, in this case Liberal candidate Richard Riordan.

See also
2015 South-West Coast state by-election
List of Victorian state by-elections

References

External links
Victorian Electoral Commission: Polwarth District by-election
ABC Elections: 2015 Polwarth by-election

2015 elections in Australia
Victorian state by-elections
2010s in Victoria (Australia)